Salcedo is a town in the province of Vicenza, Veneto, Italy. It is southwest of SP72.

Overview
The town of Salcedo has an approximate population of 1,021 people were 514 are males and 507 are females. The approximate number of families is around 394 with a total of around 495 housing units. The population is most commonly known as the Salcedensi and their Patron Saint is Sant'Anna.

Sources

External links
Salcedo at Google Maps

Cities and towns in Veneto